Cristina Eugenia Reyes Hidalgo (born August 26, 1981) is an Ecuadorian poet, lawyer, and politician.

Biography
Cristina Reyes was born on August 26, 1981 into a Catholic family, the daughter of doctors Xavier Reyes Feijoo and Cristina Hidalgo de Reyes. She has two younger brothers, Xavier and Belisario Reyes Hidalgo. She studied at Las Mercedarias Catholic school, and was named queen of the city of Guayaquil in 2001. She studied law at the Catholic University of Santiago de Guayaquil and earned a master's degree in Political Action from Francisco de Vitoria University in Spain.

She competed at Miss Ecuador 2004 where she placed 1st Runner-up and gained the right to represent her country at Miss World 2004 in Sanya, China. Although she did not make the first cut at Miss World 2004, Reyes placed in the top 10's Beauty Beach and top 20's Talent competitions. In 2005, Cristina was selected to compete at Miss Earth 2005 in Quezon City, Philippines; she placed in the top 16 at the final night. It was the first Ecuadorian classification in this beauty contest.

She was a program host at TC Televisión, Telesistema (now RTS), and Ecuavisa.

Her first appearance as a reporter on television was on the program Ventana a la Calle, hosted by Kenneth Carrera, who was later replaced by Reyes when he became involved in politics.

Political career
In November 2007, Reyes was a member of the Constituent Assembly for the Social Christian Party, where she joined the panel on Sovereignty and Latin American integration.

During her term she was part of the Workers' and Social Security Commission.

In the  she retained her seat in the Assembly.

In August 2017, she accused the Legislative Administration of inefficiency in an interview, which caused her to be sanctioned in January 2018 with a 10-day suspension without pay. A week later, Judge Lucila Gómez dismissed the sanction, accepting the protective action in her favor.

Before the elections in February 2021, she requested unpaid leave from the assembly so that she could take part in the elections. 42 other members also made the same request including Wilma Andrade, Mónica Alemán, Dallyana Passailaigue and Verónica Arias. During her absence her job would be carried out by her substitute.

Personal life
Reyes has two children. On August 26, 2021, she accepted a marriage proposal from Quito businessman Patrick Mitaz.

Publications
 Travesía (2000), collection of 62 poems, most with a romantic theme
 Tierna Furia (2007), poetry collection
 @Yo Libertadora (2012), poetry collection
 Mis plenos poderes (2018), poetry collection

References

External links

 

1981 births
21st-century Ecuadorian poets
21st-century Ecuadorian lawyers
Ecuadorian television presenters
Women members of the National Assembly (Ecuador)
Ecuadorian women lawyers
Ecuadorian women poets
Living people
Members of the Ecuadorian Constituent Assembly (2007–2008)
Members of the National Assembly (Ecuador)
People from Guayaquil
Social Christian Party (Ecuador) politicians
Universidad Católica de Santiago de Guayaquil alumni
Women television personalities
21st-century Ecuadorian women writers
Ecuadorian women television presenters
Francisco de Vitoria University alumni